Lordsburg is the county seat of Hidalgo County, New Mexico, US. 

Lordsburg may also refer to:
 La Verne, California or Lordsburg, California, US
 Lordsburg College, a private college in La Verne, California, US
 Lordsburg Township, Bottineau County, North Dakota, US
 Camp Lordsburg, a WWII prisoner-of-war and internment camp in New Mexico during World War II
 Lordsburg station, an Amtrak station in Lordsburg, New Mexico, US

See also

 List of New Mexico railroads
 Lordsburg killings
 Lordsburg–Hidalgo County (disambiguation)
 Old Lordsburg High School, Lordsburg, Hidalgo, NM, USA
 Lordstown (disambiguation)
 Lordville (disambiguation)